Slobodenyuk is a gender-neutral Ukrainian surname. Notable people with the surname include:

Vadym Slobodenyuk (born 1981), Ukrainian runner
Vitaliy Slobodenyuk (born 1953), Soviet sprint canoer

Ukrainian-language surnames